Starbulls Rosenheim is a professional ice hockey team based in Rosenheim, Oberbayern, Germany. They currently play in Oberliga. Prior to the 2013–14 season they played in the 2nd Bundesliga. They play their home games at Rofa-Stadion, located in Rosenheim, Oberbayern, Germany.

The team joined SB/DJK Rosenheim in 1979, after EV Rosenheim had folded, and in 1994 the team adopted their current name. The team played in the Deutsche Eishockey Liga (DEL) from 1995-2000. In 2000, the Star Bulls Rosenheim sold their DEL licence to the Iserlohn Roosters. The current team Starbulls Rosenheim e.V. was founded on May 23, 2000 and had to restart in the lowest league the Bezirksliga.

Achievements 
West German championship:
Winners (3) : 1982, 1985, 1989
Deutscher Eishockey-Pokal (DEB Pokal):
Winners (1) : 2011

Players

Roster season 2018/19
Updated October 27, 2018

Retired numbers

Former players

Former coaches

References

External links
starbulls.de – official team website  
rosenheim-fans.de – fan website 

Ice hockey teams in Germany
Rosenheim
Deutsche Eishockey Liga teams
Sport in Upper Bavaria
1928 establishments in Germany
Ice hockey clubs established in 1928
Ice hockey teams in Bavaria